The 2010 Championship Cup, (known for commercial reasons as the Northern Rail Cup), was the 9th season of the rugby league football competition for clubs in Great Britain's Co-operative Championship and Championship One.

In the final, played at Bloomfield Road in Blackpool with Batley Bulldogs defeating the Widnes Vikings 25-24 to claim the trophy.

Format
The format and structure of the 2010 Northern Rail Cup competition was the same as in 2009. All the English-based Co-operative Championship and Championship One clubs have been divided equally into two pools for the group stages with five teams from each division in each pool.

Each team played two home games and two away games against teams in their pool with each club playing an equal number of The Co-operative Championship and The Co-operative Championship One clubs.

The top four teams in each pool following the conclusion of the group stage fixtures then progressed into an open draw for the knock-out quarter-final stage.

The Northern Rail Cup quarter-finals were played on the weekend of 5 and 6 June with the semi-finals taking place on 19 and 20 June.

The winners of the Northern Rail Cup were eligible to apply for a Super League licence in 2011.

Toulouse Olympique and newly formed South Wales Scorpions did not participate in the 2010 Northern Rail Cup.

Fixtures

Pool 1

Round 1

Round 2

Round 3

Round 4

Pool 1 Qualification Table

Pool 2

Round 1

Round 2

Round 3

Round 4

Pool 2 Qualification Table

Finals
Sky Sports televised one Northern Rail Cup quarter-final tie live on Thursday 3 June and one of the semi-finals on Thursday 17 June as well as providing full coverage of the Northern Rail Cup final at Bloomfield Road, Blackpool, on Sunday 18 July.

Quarter-finals
The Northern Rail Cup quarter-final draw took place on Wednesday 24 March and was broadcast live on Sky Sports’ weekly Boots N' All programme.

Barrow, Batley, Hunslet, Keighley, Leigh, Sheffield, Widnes & York all qualified for the quarter-final stage of the competition. The eight teams were entered into the open draw for the quarter-final knock-out stages which was played on the weekend of 5 and 6 June. Only Hunslet and York come from Co-operative Championship 1.

One quarter-final tie was brought forward to Thursday 3 June to be screened live on Sky Sports.

The teams lined up as per the table below:

Semi-finals
The semi-finals will take place on the weekend of 19 and 20 June with Sky Sports broadcasting one tie live on the Thursday night.

Final
The Northern Rail Cup final took place at Bloomfield Road, Blackpool on Sunday 18 July at 4pm live on Sky Sports. The Match was contested by Batley Bulldogs and defending champions Widnes Vikings, who were looking for their 3rd cup victory in just 4 years. Batley won the match, beating Widnes 25-24 thanks to two late tries from Alex Brown. This was Batley's first appearance in a cup final since 1998 and first in a major final since 1952. The victory leaves Batley eligible to apply for the 2012–14 Super League licences to gain promotion to the Super League, although coach Karl Harrison stated that they have no Super League ambitions.

See also
 2010 RFL Championship
 2010 Championship 1

References

2010 in English rugby league
Championship Cup